James "Jim" Keegstra (March 30, 1934 – June 2, 2014) was a public school teacher and mayor in Eckville, Alberta, Canada, who was charged and convicted of hate speech in 1984. The conviction was overturned by the Court of Appeal of Alberta but reinstated by the Supreme Court of Canada in R v Keegstra. The decision received substantial international attention and became a landmark Canadian legal case upholding the constitutionality of Canada's hate speech laws.

Life
Keegstra was born in Vulcan, Alberta, March 30, 1934, to Dutch immigrant parents who were devout members of the Dutch Reformed Church. Keegstra was an auto mechanic, mayor of Eckville, Alberta from 1974 until 1983, and a high school teacher until he was fired in December 1982. He died in Red Deer, Alberta, on June 2, 2014, and was survived by four children.

Legal issues

Initial trial
In 1984, Keegstra was stripped of his teaching certificate, after having been fired in December 1982, and charged under the Criminal Code with "wilfully promoting hatred against an identifiable group" by teaching his social studies students that the Holocaust was a fraud and attributing various evil qualities to Jews. He thus described Jews to his pupils as "treacherous", "subversive", "sadistic", "money-loving", "power hungry" and "child killers". He taught his classes that the Jewish people seek to destroy Christianity and are responsible for depressions, anarchy, chaos, wars, and revolution. According to Keegstra, the Jews "created the Holocaust to gain sympathy" and, in contrast to the open and honest Christians, were said to be deceptive, secretive and inherently evil. He taught his students the myth of a Jewish world-conspiracy whose blueprint allegedly came from the Talmud. Keegstra expected his students to reproduce his teachings in class and on exams. If they failed to do so, their marks suffered.

Keegstra attempted to have this charge quashed as a violation of his freedom of expression; this motion was denied, and he was convicted at trial. Many of his former students testified against him. 

Publicly stating that Keegstra had brought their town into disrepute, locals were unable to impeach Keegstra as mayor and instead overwhelmingly voted him out of office at the November 1983 election.

Appeals
Keegstra appealed this conviction to the Court of Appeal of Alberta, claiming that it was in violation of Section 2(b) of the Canadian Charter of Rights and Freedoms. This section guarantees "freedom of thought, belief, opinion and expression, including freedom of the press and other media of communication".  Keegstra also challenged his conviction on the grounds that Section 319(3)(a) of the Criminal Code, which states that a person cannot be convicted of promoting hatred if she or he establishes that the statement is true, but only where the accused proves the truth of the communicated statements on a balance of probabilities, was a violation of Section 11(d) of the Charter. That section guarantees "the right to be presumed innocent until proven guilty according to law in a fair and public hearing by an independent and impartial tribunal". Keegstra was not able to demonstrate the truth of the many antisemitic statements he made to his students, on a balance of probabilities. In the CBC News presentation Canada's Hate Law: The Keegstra Case (1991), Keegstra himself displayed the material in which his views were obtained, admitting that none of it came from mainstream historical sources.

Keegstra's appeal ultimately reached the Supreme Court of Canada, in the case of R v Keegstra. In December 1990, the Court upheld Keegstra's conviction, ruling that the law's prohibition of hate propaganda and suppression of Keegstra's freedom of expression was constitutional. The majority of Justices looked at hate speech as not being a victimless crime, but instead having the potential for psychological harm, degradation, humiliation, and a risk of violence.

Sentencing
At his original trial, Keegstra was given a fine of $5,000. A subsequent decision by the Alberta Court of Appeal reduced that to a one-year suspended sentence, one year of probation, and 200 hours of community service work. While the Supreme Court upheld the original conviction and the constitutionality of the law, they did not restore the original sentence.

Social Credit Party
Keegstra was a long-time activist in the Social Credit Party of Canada and was a candidate for the party in Red Deer in the 1972, 1974 and 1984 federal elections coming in last place in each attempt.

In 1983, Social Credit leader Martin Hattersley suspended Keegstra's membership and tried to expel him because of his anti-Semitic activism; when the party voted to reinstate Keegstra, Hattersley resigned, saying "I simply cannot be leader of a party that has people accepted into its ranks that publicly express views of that sort."

In 1986, Keegstra ran unsuccessfully for the party's leadership with the support of white supremacist Don Andrews and Holocaust denier Ernst Zündel. He lost by 67 votes to 38 to Harvey Lainson, an evangelical minister from Ontario. Keegstra was elected as the party's acting leader on July 27, 1987, after the party's national executive ousted Lainson over his call to rename the party "Christian Freedom". Lainson refused to relinquish the leadership and Keegstra was expelled from the Social Credit Party and its successor the Christian Freedom Social Credit Party in September.

In popular culture

The 1988 American television movie Evil in Clear River was based on the Keegstra case.  The movie depicted a teacher and mayor of a small Canadian town who taught anti-Semitic ideas to his students, the efforts of the mother of one of his students to stop him, and the teacher's termination and prosecution.  Randy Quaid played the character that was based on Keegstra, and Lindsay Wagner played the mother.

See also 
Doug Christie (lawyer) – Keegstra's lawyer, a late political figure
Malcolm Ross (school teacher) – Canadian teacher found liable under human rights legislation for discriminating against Jewish students

References

Keegstra: The Trial, The Issues, The Consequences. Book Review
Echoes of Auschwitz News Report on Holocaust Education
Lee, Robert Mason. "Keegstra's Children". Saturday Night 100 (May 1985): 38–46.

1934 births
2014 deaths
Alberta candidates for Member of Parliament
Canadian conspiracy theorists
Canadian people of Dutch descent
Canadian schoolteachers
Canadian Holocaust deniers
Mayors of places in Alberta
People from Vulcan County
Social Credit Party of Canada candidates in the 1972 Canadian federal election
Social Credit Party of Canada leaders
Canadian politicians convicted of crimes